Kołczygłowy  (formerly ) is a village in Bytów County, Pomeranian Voivodeship, in northwestern Poland. It is the seat of the gmina (administrative district) called Gmina Kołczygłowy.

The rural church was the place of the marriage of Otto von Bismarck and Johanna von Puttkamer on 28 July 1847.

The village has a population of 1,188.

Notable people 
 Czesław Lang (born 1955 in Kołczygłowy) a Polish former road racing cyclist.

See also
History of Pomerania

References

Villages in Bytów County